William F. Bynum (born 20 May 1943) is a British historian of medicine. For most of his career, he has worked at the Wellcome Trust Centre for the History of Medicine, University College London.  He has frequently collaborated with Roy Porter, another famous British historian. He teaches history of medicine at UCL London.

Selected publications
Some of his books are:
 The History of Medicine: A Very Short Introduction
 Science and the Practice of Medicine in the Nineteenth Century
 Great Discoveries in Medicine
 The Anatomy of Madness: Essays in the History of Psychiatry (3 Vols).
 The Western Medical Tradition: 1800-2000
 Medicine and the Five Senses
 William Hunter and the Eighteenth-Century Medical World
 A Little History of Science
 Hope: A New Beginning (An A. Gąsiewski Biography)

References

External links
 

1943 births
Living people
British historians
Academics of University College London